Maxim Piskunov (born ) is a Russian road and track cyclist. He competed at the 2016 UEC European Track Championships in the elimination race event and scratch event.

Major results

2015
 UEC European Junior Track Championships
1st  Team pursuit
1st  Madison
2nd  Scratch
2nd  Kilo
 1st  Team pursuit, National Junior Track Championships
2016
 1st  Madison (with Sergey Rostovtsev), UEC European Under-23 Track Championships
 1st  Madison (with Sergey Rostovtsev), National Track Championships
2017
 1st  Madison (with Denis Nekrasov), National Track Championships
 2nd  Elimination, UEC European Track Championships
 UEC European Under-23 Track Championships
2nd  Madison
3rd  Scratch
3rd  Elimination
 9th Overall Five Rings of Moscow
2018
 1st Stage 4 Tour of Cartier
 1st Stage 1 Vuelta a Costa Rica
2019
 1st Stage 10 Tour du Maroc
 1st Stage 4 Tour of Mersin
 1st Stage 3 Five Rings of Moscow
 3rd Minsk Cup
 5th Grand Prix Minsk
2020
 1st GP Antalya
 8th Grand Prix Alanya
2021
 6th GP Manavgat

References

1997 births
Living people
Russian male cyclists
Russian track cyclists
Place of birth missing (living people)
21st-century Russian people